Chorizanthe is a genus of plants in the buckwheat family known generally as spineflowers. These are small, squat, herbaceous plants with spiny-looking inflorescences of flowers. The flowers may be in shades of red or yellow to white. The bracts are pointed and sometimes tipped with a hooked awn, and the inflorescence often dries into a rounded, spiny husk. Spineflowers are found in western North America and South America.

Name derivation: The word Chorizanthe comes from the Greek roots chorizo and anthos meaning "to divide," and "flower," thus meaning "divided flowers," but actually used in reference to the divided calyx.

Selected species:
 Chorizanthe angustifolia - narrowleaf spineflower
 Chorizanthe aphanantha
 Chorizanthe biloba - twolobe spineflower
 Chorizanthe blakleyi - Blakley's spineflower
 Chorizanthe brevicornu - brittle spineflower
 Chorizanthe breweri - San Luis Obispo spineflower
 Chorizanthe corrugata - wrinkled spineflower
 Chorizanthe cuspidata - San Francisco spineflower
 Chorizanthe diffusa - diffuse spineflower
 Chorizanthe douglasii - San Benito spineflower
 Chorizanthe fimbriata - fringed spineflower
 Chorizanthe howellii - Mendocino spineflower
 Chorizanthe leptotheca - Ramona spineflower
 Chorizanthe membranacea - pink spineflower
 Chorizanthe obovata - spoonsepal spineflower
 Chorizanthe orcuttiana - San Diego spineflower
 Chorizanthe palmeri - Palmer's spineflower
 Chorizanthe parryi - San Bernardino spineflower
 Chorizanthe polygonoides - knotweed spineflower
 Chorizanthe procumbens - prostrate spineflower
 Chorizanthe pungens - Monterey spineflower
 Chorizanthe rectispina - prickly spineflower
 Chorizanthe rigida - devil's spineflower, rigid spineflower
 Chorizanthe robusta - robust spineflower
 Chorizanthe spinosa - Mojave spineflower
 Chorizanthe staticoides - Turkish rugging
 Chorizanthe stellulata - starlet spineflower
 Chorizanthe uniaristata - one-awned spineflower
 Chorizanthe valida - Sonoma spineflower
 Chorizanthe ventricosa - Priest Valley spineflower
 Chorizanthe watsonii - fivetooth spineflower
 Chorizanthe wheeleri - Santa Barbara spineflower
 Chorizanthe xanti - Riverside spineflower

External links
 Jepson Manual Treatment
 Key to the genus

 
Polygonaceae genera
Taxa named by George Bentham